Svídnice is a municipality and village in Rychnov nad Kněžnou District in the Hradec Králové Region of the Czech Republic. It has 162 inhabitants as of January 2022.

Administrative parts
The village of Suchá Rybná is an administrative part of Svídnice.

References

Villages in Rychnov nad Kněžnou District